Tlacolulan is a municipality located in the montane central zone in the State of Veracruz, about 17 km from state capital Xalapa. It has a surface of 137.36 km2. It was inhabited by the totonac pre-Hispanic, of the former ones of Xalapa's region. For decree number 25 of April 14, 1861 the Government of the State, ordered that the people head-board of this municipality names Tlacolulan of the Free ones.

Geographic Limits

The municipality of Tlacolulan is delimited to the north by Tenochtitlán, to the east by Coacoatzintla and Tonayan and to the south by Acajete. It is watered by small creeks that are tributaries of the river Actópan

Agriculture

It produces principally maize.

Celebrations

In  Tlacolulan , in December takes place the celebration in honor to Virgen de la Concepción, Patron of the town, and in September takes place the celebration in honor to Virgen de la Natividad.

Weather

The weather in  Tlacolulan  is cold and wet all year with rains all year round.

References

External links 

  Municipal Official webpage
  Municipal Official Information

Municipalities of Veracruz